Macau competed at the 2008 Summer Paralympics in Beijing, China. Macau was represented by two athletes: Kuong Sio-leng in women's shot put and discus, and Ao Loi-si in men's 50m and 100m freestyle swimming. Macau did not win any medals.

Athletics

Swimming

External links
Beijing 2008 Paralympic Games Official Site
International Paralympic Committee

References

Nations at the 2008 Summer Paralympics
2008
Paralympics